Maria Rita Teresa Batalla-Laforteza is a Filipino artist.

She has participated in various group shows, among them Ika 2 Yugto at Galeria de las Islas, the Brushes with Words & Chords Making: Love in Fourteen Collaborative Acts and the like.

In 2013 her exhibition Memories, Music & Me 2 – A Tribute to the Legacy of Domingo M. Batalla was shown in Cabuyao.

References 

Living people
Filipino artists
University of Santo Tomas alumni
People from Cabuyao
Artists from Laguna (province)
Year of birth missing (living people)